Volume testing belongs to the group of non-functional tests, which are often misunderstood and/or used interchangeably. Volume testing refers to testing a software application with a certain amount of data. This amount can, in generic terms, be the database size or it could also be the size of an interface file that is the subject of volume testing. For example, if you want to volume test your application with a specific database size, you will expand your database to that size and then test the application's performance on it. Another example could be when there is a requirement for your application to interact with an interface file (could be any file such as .dat, .xml); this interaction could be reading and/or writing on to/from the file. You will create a sample file of the size you want and then test the application's functionality with that file in order to test the performance.

Software testing